Lautiosaari (standard abbreviation: Li) is a railway junction in the city of Kemi in Finland. The junction is located approximately two kilometers north from Kemi railway station on Oulu–Tornio main line where the Elijärvi branch line diverges from the main line. The junction is named after nearby Lautiosaari village within Keminmaa municipality.

The junction consists of three railway signals and two interlocked and corresponding railway switches, forming a set of catch points protecting the main line. The junction was opened for traffic in 1985, and it was in active use until 2005, when the Elijärvi mine chose trucks over trains for its ore transportation needs between Elijärvi and Tornio.

Railway stations in Lapland (Finland)